The first USS Valiant (SP-535) was a United States Navy patrol vessel in commission from 1917 to 1919.

Valiant was built in 1896 as a private sailing cutter of the same name by Charles S. Drowne. She was rebuilt in 1907 and was fitted with an auxiliary engine to augment her sails in 1917.

In 1917, the U.S. Navy acquired Valiant under a free lease from her owner, Henry M. Warren, for use as a section patrol vessel during World War I. She was commissioned as USS Valiant (SP-535) on 29 May 1917 at Philadelphia, Pennsylvania.

Assigned to the 4th Naval District, Valiant operated on patrol duties in the Cape May, New Jersey, area for the rest of World War I.

Valiant was decommissioned at the Corinthian Yacht Club near Philadelphia on 11 January 1919 and returned to her owner soon thereafter.

Notes

References

NavSource Online: Section Patrol Craft Photo Archive: Valiant (SP 535)

Patrol vessels of the United States Navy
World War I patrol vessels of the United States
1896 ships